Zirbes is a surname. Notable people with the surname include:

Laura Zirbes (1884–1967), American educator
Maik Zirbes (born 1990), German basketball player
 (1825–1901), German writer

See also
Zerbes
Zirbel